A battlecarrier is a large, often hypothetical, hybrid naval ship designed to combine aspects of both an aircraft carrier and either a battleship or battlecruiser. This term is primarily used to refer to the following:

the American 
the Soviet 
the Japanese s after their conversion to hybrid carriers
various plans to modernize the American s into aircraft carriers, such as the Interdiction Assault Ship

Since the early 1930s many plans and projects to make a battlecarrier was made, such a project which was close to being built was a project made by the United States and the Soviet Union, but was cancelled. Battlecarriers, theoretically, would perform poorly in battle if they were created. Their hangar and flight deck is inviting for enemy attacks and due to the same hangar, less armament can be carried, and vice versa.

See also
Aircraft cruiser
Helicopter destroyer

Nautical terminology
Ship types
Battleships
Aircraft carriers